Bihari Hindi is a variant of Hindustani, spoken in Bihar, particularly in Patna and nearby districts. It is heavily influenced by Magahi and Maithili, and subsequently by Bhojpuri. It shares more vocabulary from Maithili and Magahi as compared to Hindi.

Morphology

Nouns
Hindi distinguishes two genders (masculine and feminine), two noun types (count and non-count), two numbers (singular and plural), and three cases (direct, oblique, and vocative). But in Bihari dialect, direct case is most commonly used. Other cases are dormant. Inflectional plural is also not used, periphrastic plural is used. However, a weak inflected plural is there in Bihari dialect, borrowed from eastern Hindi and Bhojpuri (-an). Nouns divided into two classes- marked and unmarked, of which nothing is the difference except that the marked form is used for declinable adjectives.

Gender system is usually same as Hindi, but differs in that only animates and real gender is marked in Bihari dialect.

The table below displays the suffix paradigms. -Ø denotes that no suffix is added to the noun stem.

Plural is not mandatory, it can be dropped when inanimate or indefinite. The next table of noun declensions, shows the above suffix paradigms in action. Words: laṛkā ('boy'), kū̃ā ('well'), seb ('apple'), vālid  ('father'), cāqū ('penknife'), ādmī  ('man'), mitr ('friend'), laṛkī ('girl'), ciṛiyā ('finch'), kitāb ('book'), bhāṣā ('language'), and aurat ('woman').

Notes for noun declension:

 A small number of marked masculines like kuā̃ display nasalization of all terminations.
 Some masculines ending in ā fall in the unmarked category. i.e. vālid "father", cācā "uncle", rājā "king".
 Unmarked nouns ending in ū and ī generally shorten this to u and i before the plural termination(s), with the latter also inserting the semivowel y.
 Many feminine Sanskrit loanwords such as bhāṣā ('language') and mātā (mother) end in ā, therefore the ā is not a reliable indicator of noun gender.
 The iyā ending is also not a reliable indicator of gender or noun type. Some words such as pahiyā ('wheel') and Persian takiyā ('pillow') are masculine marked: pahiyan ('wheels'), takiyan ('pillows'). Feminine loanwords such as Arabic duniyā ('world') and Sanskrit kriyā ('action') use feminine unmarked.
 Perso-Arabic loans ending in final unpronounced h are handled as masculine marked nouns. Hence bacca(h) → baccā. The former is the Urdu spelling, the latter the Hindi.

Adjectives
Adjectives may be divided into declinable, and indeclinable categories. Declinables are marked, through termination, for the gender of the nouns they qualify. Instead of number, adjectives are qualified for honour, a characteristic feature of Bihari languages.

Plural can be made of weak plural, but is not used as adjective. They are rather used as adverb.

The set of declinable adjective terminations is similar but greatly simplified in comparison to that of noun terminations —

Indeclinable adjectives are completely invariable, and can end in either consonants or vowels (including ā and ī ). A number of declinables display nasalisation of all terminations.

Examples of declinable (type-1) adjectives: baṛā "big", choṭā "small", moṭā "fat", acchā "good", burā "bad", kālā "black", ṭhaṇḍā "cold".
Examples of declinable (type-2) adjectives: baṛhiyā "great/awesome", ghatiyā "of bad quality or nature", cūtiyā "idiot"/ "asshole".
Examples of declinable (type-3) adjectives: dāyā̃ "right (direction)", bāyā̃ "left (direction)"
Examples of indeclinable adjectives: xarāb "bad", sāf "clean", bhārī "heavy", murdā "dead", sundar "beautiful", pāgal "crazy/mad", lāl "red".

References

Bibliography
 
 
 

Hindi languages
Languages of Bihar